Ferenc Antalovics (born 9 July 1953) is a Hungarian weightlifter. He competed at the 1976 Summer Olympics and the 1980 Summer Olympics.

References

External links
 

1953 births
Living people
Hungarian male weightlifters
Olympic weightlifters of Hungary
Weightlifters at the 1976 Summer Olympics
Weightlifters at the 1980 Summer Olympics
Sportspeople from Vas County
World Weightlifting Championships medalists
20th-century Hungarian people
21st-century Hungarian people